Luis Raúl Cabrera Colón (April 26, 1919 – September 16, 1977) was a Puerto Rican pitcher who played in the Negro leagues in the 1940s.

A native of Ponce, Puerto Rico, Cabrera played for the Indianapolis Clowns in 1948. In five recorded appearances on the mound, he posted a 4.09 ERA over 33 innings. Cabrera died in Trujillo Alto, Puerto Rico in 1977 at age 58.

References

External links
 and Baseball-Reference Black Baseball Stats and Seamheads

1919 births
1977 deaths
Indianapolis Clowns players
Puerto Rican baseball players
Baseball pitchers
Sportspeople from Ponce, Puerto Rico